Charlotte Massardier (born 12 October 1975) is a French former synchronized swimmer who competed in the 1996 Summer Olympics and in the 2000 Summer Olympics.

References

1975 births
Living people
French synchronized swimmers
Olympic synchronized swimmers of France
Synchronized swimmers at the 1996 Summer Olympics
Synchronized swimmers at the 2000 Summer Olympics